Splendid Isolation is the second studio album recorded by Yonderboi.

Track listing

Contributors

Imre Németh Primary School Chamber Choir - led by Lilla Farkas (track 1)
Albert Márkos - cello (track 1, 10, 12)
Zsolt Ábrahám - guitar (track 2, 4, 5, 6, 7, 8, 11, 13
Andor Kovács - guitar (track 3, 6, 7)
Krisztián Szűcs - vocals (track 4, 7, 8)
Scott Salinas - guitar (track 4)
Gábor Subicz - trumpet (track 4), brass (track 7)
Abbas Murad - trombone (track 4), brass (track 7)
Edina Kutzora - vocals (track 5), backing vocals (track 7, 8)
Imre Poniklo - vocals (track 6)
Oszkár Ács - bass (track 6, 7)
Synthia - vocals (track 11)
Edward Ka-Spel - vocals (track 13)
Olaf Heine - cover photo

References

External links
 Splendid Isolation at Mole Listening Pearls webpage

2005 albums
Yonderboi albums